Umroli is a town in Maharashtra. It also has a railway station on the western Line of the Mumbai Suburban Railway. Umroli was situated in the old Thane District of Maharashtra. After the bifurcation, it is now a part of Palghar district.

Location

Industrial area and power stations
Tarapur Industrial Estate, Tarapur Atomic Power Station and a thermal power station owned by Reliance Energy Limited are located close by. The huge industrial area at Tarapur accommodates various specialty chemical, bulk drugs, steel and alloy and textile manufacturing companies.

References 

Cities and towns in Palghar district